The Motatán River is a river of Venezuela. It drains into Lake Maracaibo.

The river flows through the Maracaibo dry forests ecoregion before emptying into Lake Maracaibo from the east.

See also
List of rivers of Venezuela

References

Rivers of Venezuela